Elias Majdalani (born 12 June 1966) is a Lebanese alpine skier. He competed at the 1988 Winter Olympics and the 1992 Winter Olympics.

References

1966 births
Living people
Lebanese male alpine skiers
Olympic alpine skiers of Lebanon
Alpine skiers at the 1988 Winter Olympics
Alpine skiers at the 1992 Winter Olympics
Place of birth missing (living people)